Burg Liebenstein is the name of a number of castles:
 Burg Liebenstein (Thuringia), Liebenstein, Ilm-Kreis in Thuringia
 Burg Liebenstein (Rhein), Kamp-Bornhofen in Rhineland-Palatinate
 Burg Liebenstein (Bayern) bei Plößberg in Bavaria
 Burgstall Liebenstein, Bad Kötzting in Bayern
 Burg Liebenstein (Wartburgkreis) bei Bad Liebenstein in Thuringia
 Burg Liebenstein (Tschechien) in Libá (Liebenstein) bei Eger (Cheb) in Czech Republic